Shibchar is an upazila of Madaripur District in the Division of Dhaka, Bangladesh.

Geography
It has 58085 households and total area 321.88 km2.

Demographics
As of the 1991 Bangladesh census, Shibchar has a population of 306082. Males constitute 51.46% of the population, and females 48.54%. This Upazila's eighteen up population is 143975. Shibchar has an average literacy rate of 26.9% (7+ years), and the national average of 32.4% literate.

Administration
Shibchar Upazila is divided into Shibchar Municipality and 19 union parishads: Bahertala Dakshin, Baheratala Uttar, Bandarkhola, Baskandi, Charjanazat, Dattapara, Ditiyakhando, Kadirpur, Kathalbari, Kutubpur, Madbarerchar, Nilokhe, Panchar, Sannasirchar, Shibchar, Shiruail, Umedpur, Vhadrasion, and Vhandarikandi. The union parishads are subdivided into 108 mauzas and 519 villages.

Shibchar Municipality is subdivided into 9 wards and 17 mahallas.

See also
 Upazilas of Bangladesh
 Districts of Bangladesh
 Divisions of Bangladesh
 Fazlur Khan, designer of Sears Tower.

References

Upazilas of Madaripur District